Rasmus Christian Quaade (born 7 January 1990) is a Danish former road and track bicycle racer. He also competed professionally from 2009 to 2021 for the Blue Water Cycling (two spells),  and  squads.

Quaade was also the subject for a documentary film, following him in the leadup to the 2011 UCI World Under-23 Road Race Championships, called Moon Rider.

Major results

Road

2009
 2nd Time trial, National Under-23 Road Championships
 3rd  Time trial, UEC European Under-23 Road Championships
 4th Chrono Champenois
 9th Time trial, UCI Under-23 Road World Championships
2010
 1st  Time trial, National Under-23 Road Championships
 1st Chrono Champenois
2011
 1st  Time trial, National Road Championships
 1st  Time trial, National Under-23 Road Championships
 2nd  Time trial, UCI Under-23 Road World Championships
 2nd Chrono Champenois
2012
 1st  Time trial, UEC European Under-23 Road Championships
 1st  Time trial, National Under-23 Road Championships
 3rd Chrono Champenois
 5th Time trial, UCI Under-23 Road World Championships
2013
 2nd Time trial, National Road Championships
 4th Chrono Champenois
 6th Time trial, UCI Road World Championships
2014
 1st  Time trial, National Road Championships
 1st Chrono Champenois
 3rd Overall Giro della Regione Friuli Venezia Giulia
2015
 2nd Time trial, National Road Championships
 5th Time trial, European Games
 5th Overall Tour du Poitou-Charentes
2016
 9th Overall Four Days of Dunkirk
2017
 3rd Overall Ronde de l'Oise
1st Stage 3
 3rd Overall Flèche du Sud
 3rd Scandinavian Race Uppsala
 7th Overall Kreiz Breizh Elites
 7th Overall Okolo Jižních Čech
 10th Skive–Løbet
2018
 1st Duo Normand (with Martin Toft Madsen)
 1st Classic Loire-Atlantique
 2nd Overall Danmark Rundt
 3rd Time trial, National Road Championships
 4th Overall Paris–Arras Tour
 7th Hafjell GP
 8th Sundvolden GP
 9th Time trial, UEC European Road Championships
2019
 1st Fyen Rundt
 1st Duo Normand (with Mathias Norsgaard)
 3rd Overall Danmark Rundt
 3rd Hafjell GP
 4th Chrono des Nations

Track

2011
 2nd  Team pursuit, UEC European Track Championships
 3rd  Team pursuit, 2011–12 UCI Track Cycling World Cup, Cali
2012
 1st  Team pursuit, 2012–13 UCI Track Cycling World Cup, Glasgow
2013
 Team pursuit, 2013–14 UCI Track Cycling World Cup
2nd  Aguascalientes
3rd  Manchester
 3rd  Team pursuit, UCI Track World Championships
2014
 2nd  Team pursuit, UCI Track World Championships
 3rd  Team pursuit, 2014–15 UCI Track Cycling World Cup, London
2015
 3rd  Team pursuit, UEC European Track Championships
2016
 3rd  Team pursuit, Olympic Games
 3rd  Team pursuit, UCI Track World Championships

References

External links

Moon Rider official website

1990 births
Living people
Danish male cyclists
Danish track cyclists
Cyclists from Copenhagen
Cyclists at the 2012 Summer Olympics
Cyclists at the 2016 Summer Olympics
Olympic cyclists of Denmark
Medalists at the 2016 Summer Olympics
Olympic bronze medalists for Denmark
Olympic medalists in cycling
European Games competitors for Denmark
Cyclists at the 2015 European Games